Archibald Robert Taylor (born 26 November 1941) is a New Zealand former cricketer. He played first-class cricket for Wellington and List A cricket for Auckland.

Taylor was a promising right-arm fast-medium bowler who played 13 matches of first-class cricket for Wellington between 1963 and 1966 before his career was interrupted by injury. He resumed as a medium-pace bowler for a few one-day matches for Auckland in the 1970s. In his last match he took two wickets to help Auckland win the final in December 1978. His best first-class figures were 6 for 47 in Wellington's two-wicket victory over Northern Districts in 1965–66.

See also
 List of Auckland representative cricketers

References

External links
 

1941 births
Living people
New Zealand cricketers
Auckland cricketers
Wellington cricketers
People from Westport, New Zealand